SES-imagotag is a specialist in electronic shelf labeling systems and physical retail founded in 1992. The group designs and markets all of its system's components (software, radio-frequency infrastructure, labels and mountings).

History 
Created under the name "Store Electronic Systems" (SES) in 1992, SES equipped its first store with electronic shelf labels (ESLs) in 1993.

Listed on the Paris stock exchange in 2006, the company keep on expanding its international business with offices in Asia and Latin America as soon as 2007.

In 2012, Thierry Gadou became chairman and CEO of the company. Connected electronic shelf labels (NFC) are installed during the same year.

In 2014, a strategic alliance is signed with imagotag GmbH (Austria) and Store Electronic Systems became SES-imagotag.

In 2015, SES-imagotag signs the largest ever contract of the electronic shelf labeling market.

In 2016, the Group signed an exclusive contract with Jysk Nordic, highlighting a rising interest from non-food retailers in the solutions provided by the Group. A trend confirmed by another deal signed with Sephora to equip the cosmetics' retailer French stores.

In 2018, the company launches a digital and IoT platform operating on Microsoft's cloud, which aims to provide a better customer experience and store efficiency.

Economic information 
SES-imagotag has over 500 employees. In the first half of 2022, SES-imagotag's sales reached €285.0 million (an increase of 41% from 2021).

In 2018, SES-imagotag and BOE Technology (a Chinese global semiconductor display group and supplier of IoT technologies) join forces, the latter holding 79.94% of SES-imagotag's share capital.

In 2018, SES-imagotag sold 160 million labels in 17,000 stores and has nearly 200 customers in more than 60 countries. Its main contracts are: Euronics, Dixons, Coop, Jula, Colruyt, Carrefour, Sharaf DG or Etisalat.

Offices and clients 
SES-imagotag represented worldwide and has sales offices in 12 countries: France, Austria, Germany, Australia, Canada, Spain, US, Italy, Mexico, Singapore and Taiwan. The R&D Center is based in Graz (Austria)

Partnerships 

 In 2017 with Husmann Australia to launch an IoT platform for food retailers in Australia
 In 2018 with Panasonic to develop a shelf monitoring system that automatically detects out-of-stock items
 In 2019 with Cisco to develop an IoT infrastructure for physical commerce
 Has Resellers network of 156 companies presenting company worldwide

See also 
 Electronic shelf label

References 

Companies established in 1992
Information technology companies of France
2017 mergers and acquisitions